Amanda Zahui Bazoukou (born September 8, 1993), known professionally as Amanda Zahui B., is a Swedish basketball player for the Washington Mystics of the Women's National Basketball Association (WNBA). After playing basketball both in Sweden and collegiately with the Minnesota Golden Gophers, Bazoukou was drafted by the Tulsa Shock with the second overall pick in the 2015 WNBA draft.

Early life
Zahui Bazoukou began playing basketball when she was 10. By 13, Sweden had added her to its 16-and-under national team where she averaged double-doubles in the European Championships.

Her surname is pronounced ZAH-wee B. She shortened Bazoukou to an initial so it would fit on her jersey and be easier for Americans to pronounce.

Her mother is Spanish-French and her father is from the Ivory Coast.

College
Zahui B played three seasons for the Minnesota Golden Gophers. In February 2015, Zahui B recorded a career-high 39 points in a game against Iowa Hawkeye basketball team. She also recorded 29 rebounds in that game, the most ever by a player in the Big Ten Conference. The last NBA player to record at least 39 points and 29 rebounds in a  game was Moses Malone in October 1979.

Minnesota statistics
Source

Professional career

WNBA
Zahui B was drafted second overall by the Tulsa Shock when she was only a sophomore. She was 21 years old.

On January 21, 2023, Zahui B was traded from the Los Angeles Sparks to the Las Vegas Aces in exchange for Dearica Hamby. Zahui B was once again traded for the second in the offseason prior to the 2023 season. On February 5, 2023, she was dealt to the Washington Mystics in exchange for two second-round picks.

European League
In 2016, she was transferred to the Russian Nadezhda Orenburg where she became the highest scoring player.
Her name Zahui caused some stir due to its similarity with an obscene word in Russian. In 2017 the team decided to use the name Bazoukou instead.

Career statistics

WNBA
Source

Regular season

|-
| style="text-align:left;"| 2015
| style="text-align:left;"| Tulsa
| 31 || 0 || 9.7 || .361 || .333 || .750 || 2.4 || 0.3 || 0.2 || 0.6 || 0.6 || 3.4
|-
| style="text-align:left;"| 2016
| style="text-align:left;"| New York
| 33 || 1 || 11.3 || .449 || .118  || .787 || 3.2 || 0.4 || 0.3 || 0.7 || 1.1 || 5.0
|-
| style="text-align:left;"| 2017
| style="text-align:left;"| New York
| 29 || 0 || 5.3 || .400 || .250 || .750 || 1.1 || 0.3  || 0.2  || 0.2 || 0.5 || 2.2
|-
| style="text-align:left;"| 2018
| style="text-align:left;"| New York
| 29 || 0 || 15.9 || .500 || .344 || .605 || 3.0 || 0.7 || 0.4 || 0.4 || 1.6 || 7.7
|-
| style="text-align:left;"| 2019
| style="text-align:left;"| New York
| 24 || 23 || 23.3 || .468 || .319 || .852 || 6.3 || 0.9 || 1.1 || 1.4 || 1.3 || 8.6
|-
| style="text-align:left;"| 2020
| style="text-align:left;"| New York
| 21 || 20 || 25.3 || .353 || .340 || .694 || 8.5 || 1.9 || 0.9 || 1.2 || 2.6 || 9.0
|-
| style="text-align:left;"| 2021
| style="text-align:left;"| Los Angeles
| 30 || 27 || 23.8 || .429 || .280 || .767 || 5.1 || 1.0 || 0.6 || 1.2 || 1.8 || 9.2
|-
| align="left" | Career
| 7 years, 3 teams
| 197 || 71 || 15.7 || .428 || .312 || .743 || 4.0 || 0.7 || 0.5 || 0.8 || 1.3 || 6.2
|}

Playoffs

|-
| style="text-align:left;"| 2015
| style="text-align:left;"| Tulsa
| 2 || 0 || 6.0 || .000 || .000 || – || 1.5 || 0.0 || 0.0 || 0.5 || 0.0 || 0.0
|-
| style="text-align:left;"| 2016
| style="text-align:left;"| New York
| 1 || 0 || 6.0 || 1.000 || – || – || 2.0 || 0.0 || 0.0 || 0.0 || 0.0 || 2.0
|-
| style="text-align:left;"| 2017
| style="text-align:left;"| New York
| 1 || 0 || 1.0 || – || – || – || 1.0 || 0.0 || 0.0 || 0.0 || 0.0 || 0.0
|-
| align="left" | Career
| 3 years, 2 teams
| 4 || 0 || 4.8 || .250 || .000 || – || 1.5 || 0.0 || 0.0 || 0.3 || 0.0 || 0.5
|}

Personal
On June 7, 2021, WNBA.com published an op-ed written by Zahui B., titled "What Does Pride Mean to Me?", in commemoration of Pride Month. Zahui B. described herself as having a "personal journey of finding myself", and publicly came out as a lesbian. She wrote, "I celebrate my body, my mind and my sexuality. I am confident and open to the fact that I was made to love women. I was created to celebrate the beautiful women on this earth. To love the most powerful creature on this earth, the woman." Zahui B. stated that she has a family who has "always been accepting and supportive" regarding her sexuality.

References

External links

Day in The Life: Amanda Zahui B.'s WNBA Draft Day

1993 births
Living people
All-American college women's basketball players
Centers (basketball)
Fenerbahçe women's basketball players
Lesbian sportswomen
LGBT basketball players
Swedish LGBT sportspeople
Los Angeles Sparks players
Minnesota Golden Gophers women's basketball players
New York Liberty players
Sportspeople from Stockholm
Swedish expatriate basketball people in the United States
Swedish people of French descent
Swedish people of Ivorian descent
Swedish people of Spanish descent
Swedish women's basketball players
Tulsa Shock draft picks
Tulsa Shock players
21st-century Swedish LGBT people